Sardinella richardsoni (Richardson's sardinella) is a species of ray-finned fish in the genus Sardinella from the South China Sea in the northwest Pacific.

Footnotes 
 

richardsoni
Fish of the Pacific Ocean
Fish described in 1983